Labeo curriei is fish in genus Labeo. It is found in the Saint Paul River in Liberia. It may also be present in the Corubal River in Guinea-Bissau.

References 

 

Labeo
Taxa named by Henry Weed Fowler
Fish described in 1919
Cyprinid fish of Africa